Eileen Fogarty is an American actress, writer, and producer. She is known for playing Mrs. Nguyen in the television show Better Call Saul and Nguyen Nguyen in F is for Family.

Background
Fogarty was born to an Irish father and Vietnamese mother and grew up in Singapore and Southern California. She can speak several languages, including German, Mandarin, and Vietnamese.

Personal life
In 1998, Fogarty married Paddy Hirsch, a British journalist who was born in England and raised in Northern Ireland. The couple live in Los Angeles, California.

Career
Fogarty performed her one-woman show It's Phuc Tap! (It's complicated) at the 2005 New York International Fringe Festival.

Filmography

References

External links 
 

Living people
21st-century American actresses
21st-century American women writers
Actresses of Vietnamese descent
American people of Irish descent
American television actresses
American television personalities
American women television personalities
American voice actresses
American women television writers
American writers of Vietnamese descent
21st-century American screenwriters
Year of birth missing (living people)
American expatriates in Singapore